Buota is an islet and a settlement on the island of Tarawa, Kiribati.
There are 1,756 inhabitants (2015). The islet is the southernmost part of North Tarawa even if there is a bridge connecting it to Bonriki and South Tarawa.

References 

Populated places in Kiribati